Hahn or Hahn Prairie is an unincorporated community in northwest Wharton County, in the U.S. state of Texas. The tiny community is located at the intersection of Farm to Market Road 1160 (FM 1160) and Farm to Market Road 2546 (FM 2546) northwest of El Campo. There are no road signs identifying the site but the nearby Hahn Cemetery is marked and there is a small cluster of homes around the junction. The surrounding farmland is dotted by a number of natural gas wells.

History
The Handbook of Texas article writes of Hahn Prairie in the past tense. A post office was established in the settlement in 1897. By 1905 the school reported two teachers and 32 students. Five years later 50 persons lived in Hahn. The post office closed in 1929. By 1933 only 20 souls lived in the community and there was only one store. The community center was abandoned in the 1940s. State highway maps identified Hahn Prairie as late as 1989. By that time only the school, cemetery and a few homes remained.

Geography
The 1965 USGS Hahn Quadrangle map placed Hahn at the intersection of north-south FM 1160 and east-west FM 2546. In that year only a handful of buildings were recorded on the map near the town site. Perhaps a dozen homes are bunched near the junction. West Mustang Creek flows south to the east of Hahn while Porter's Creek flows south to the west of the community. There are no road signs identifying the site but the nearby Hahn Cemetery is marked. There are at least 15 gas leases and one oil lease in the vicinity of Hahn.

Notes

Unincorporated communities in Wharton County, Texas
Unincorporated communities in Texas